The Shenandoah Valley AVA is an American Viticultural Area located in the Shenandoah Valley of Virginia and West Virginia.  The valley is bounded by the Blue Ridge Mountains to the east and the Appalachian and Allegheny Plateaus to the west.  Most of the AVA is in Virginia, with a small portion in the Eastern Panhandle of West Virginia.  Most of the vineyards in the AVA are located in Virginia and grow a wide variety of Vitis vinifera, Vitis labrusca, and French hybrid grapes. The hardiness zone is mainly 6b except for some 7a closer to the mouth of the Shenandoah.

The region is Virginia's first AVA, identified in 1982. Limestone soil, which is common to the Valley, has been long associated with great wine growing regions in Europe. The Shenandoah Valley AVA's climate allows grapes to attain higher acidity, generally regarded as good in wine. The cooler, relatively dry climate, soil composition and position between two mountain chains makes the Shenandoah Valley more ideal for viticulture than any of the state's other regions. The Shenandoah Valley is relatively dry, a "rain shadow" between the Blue Ridge and Allegheny Mountains; the annual rainfall in the Valley is one half that of the Virginia average. The growing season in the valley is distinctly warmer and drier than in neighboring Virginia regions, which don't have the natural rain barrier from the nearby mountains and where, east of the Blue Ridge, vineyard soils are primarily clay and loam.  The conditions in the Shenandoah Valley AVA are thus more hospitable than those east of the mountains for Cabernet Franc, Chambourcin, Cabernet Sauvignon, Lemberger, Petit Manseng, Petit Verdot, Pinot Noir, and Riesling.

List of Producers 
Wine producers in the AVA include: (from north to south) Veramar Vineyard, James Charles Winery & Vineyard, Valerie Hill Vineyard & Winery, North Mountain Vineyard & Winery, Muse Vineyards, Shenandoah Vineyards, Wolf Gap Vineyard, Cave Ridge Vineyard, The Winery at Kindred Pointe, DeMello Vineyards, Old Hill Cidery, Wisteria Farm & Vineyard, CrossKeys Vineyards, Bluestone Vineyard, Marceline Vineyards, Barren Ridge Vineyards, Ox-Eye Vineyards, Above Ground Winery, Hunt's Vineyard, Rockbridge Vineyard, Jump Mountain Vineyard, Lexington Valley Vineyard and Blue Ridge Vineyard. Briede Vineyards.

References

American Viticultural Areas
Virginia wine
West Virginia wine
1982 establishments in Virginia
Shenandoah Valley